The 2020–21 Latvian–Estonian Basketball League, known as Paf Latvian–Estonian Basketball League for sponsorship reasons, was the 3rd season of the Latvian–Estonian Basketball League, the combined top basketball division of Latvia and Estonia.

The season began on 3 October 2020 and ended in 11 April 2021. The Final 6 was played at the Elektrum Olimpiskais Sporta centrs in Riga, Latvia, with Kalev/Cramo winning its first title.

Competition format 
It was planned, that the competition format would follow the usual double round-robin format: all the teams would play each other twice, once at home and once away, for a total of 24 games; teams would have been ranked by total points, with the eight highest-ranked teams advancing to the quarter-finals; the quarterfinal series would have been played to two wins (best-of-three); the winning teams would determine the champion in a Final Four tournament.
Due to the COVID-19 pandemic risks, it was planned, that from October till 6 December teams would play only within the respective country.

It was announced in 11 November, that after 6 December due to the increasing spread of coronavirus in the region teams will continue competing within their respective country (thefore, playing 3rd and 4th lap), and so no international games will be played in the Regular season. Discussions on the play-off format are still ongoing.

Teams 

13 teams, 7 from Estonia and 6 from Latvia, are contesting the league in the 2020–21 season.

Venues and locations

Personnel and kits

Estonia

League table

Results

Latvia

League table

Results

Final 6
Final 6, which featured 3 of the highest ranked teams from each country, with highest ranked team from each country receiving a bye to semifinals, was held in Riga, Latvia from April 8 to April 11

Individual awards
Tournament MVP
Maurice Kemp (Kalev/Cramo)
All-Star Five
Maurice Kemp (Kalev/Cramo)
Janari Jõesaar (Kalev/Cramo)
Brandon Childress (Avis Utilitas Rapla)
Kyle Allman (VEF Rīga)
Rihards Kuksiks (Ogre)

References

External links
Official website
Estonian Basketball Association 
Latvian Basketball Association 

Latvia-Estonia
Latvian–Estonian Basketball League
2020–21 in Estonian basketball
2020–21 in Latvian basketball
Latvia-Estonia